Yinduo (Mandarin: 银多乡) is a township in Xinlong County, Garzê Tibetan Autonomous Prefecture, Sichuan, China. In 2010, Yinduo Township had a total population of 1,767: 876 males and 891 females: 485 aged under 14, 1,122 aged between 15 and 65 and 160 aged over 65.

References 
 

Township-level divisions of Sichuan